Nimantha Perera (born Kariyapperuma Athukoralage Sajeewa Nimantha Perera on 9 November 1981) is a Sri Lankan cricketer. He is a right-handed batsman and right-arm off-break bowler who plays for Police Sports Club. He was born in Ampara.

Perera has made a single first-class appearance for the side, in the 2008–09 season, against Panadura Sports Club. He scored 9 runs in the first innings in which he batted, and three runs in the second. He also played in one List A match in the same season.

References

External links
Nimantha Perera at Cricket Archive 

1981 births
Living people
Sri Lankan cricketers
Sri Lanka Police Sports Club cricketers
People from Eastern Province, Sri Lanka